Ilala District (Wilaya ya Ilala, in Swahili) is one of five districts of the Dar es Salaam Region of Tanzania. The district is bordered to the north by Kinondoni District, to the east by the Zanzibar Channel, the west by Pwani Region, and to the south by the Temeke District. The district is comparable in size to the land area of U.S Virgin Islands. The administrative seat is  Ilala Ward. The 2012 National Tanzania Census states the population for Ilala as 1,220,611.

Geography

Climate
Temperatures in the municipality range from 26 degrees Celsius in August to 35 degrees Celsius in December and January. During the long rainy season (March - May), the average monthly rainfall is 150mm - 300mm. The rainy season lasts from October through December, with monthly average rainfall ranging from 75mm to 100mm. The altitude of Ilala Municipality, which spans between 0 and 900 meters above sea level, has an impact on the municipality's biological characteristics. As a result, the Municipality is made up of a huge lowland area and a tiny upland zone.

The lowland areas run from the Municipality's Indian Ocean border (Kivukoni ward) to Segerea, Ukonga, and Kitunda wards. Beyond these wards, the minor upland sections of Pugu, Kinyerezi, Chanika, and Msongola wards emerge as small hills or plateaus. Whereas the majority of the Municipality's lowland sections are urban, the upland districts are largely agricultural and peri-urban in nature. The soil in these places is made up of sand, clay, and loam.

Economy
Ilala Municipal Council's main economic activities include retailing businesses such as small and medium-sized shops, hotels, bars, and restaurants, transportation services, clearing and forwarding, agro businesses, medical businesses, handcraft businesses, banking businesses, and construction businesses. These activities employ around 45% of Ilala Municipality's total population.

Infrastructure
The municipal road network is 1215.66 kilometers long. The Ilala Municipal road network is made up of 118.34 kilometers of tarmac, 264.81 kilometers of gravel, and 638.22 kilometers of earth roads, accounting for 62.49% of the entire road network in the municipality. There was no information on road surface type per division. However, the majority of the Municipal's asphalt roads are found in the Kariakoo division, whereas the Ukonga division is largely covered by earth roads.

The primary mode of public transportation is the 'daladala' bus.
The majority of them are registered and privately owned daladala in services with a total seating capacity of 25-32 seats. Dar es Salaam's public transportation services are unreliable, uncomfortable, and unsafe. Given the total size of the urban transportation fleet, the maximum daily passenger capacity is predicted to be 4.6 million passenger journeys per day.

Ilala Municipality currently has two modes of railway transportation. Tanzania Railways Corporation (TRC) operates two lines, one from Ilala-Dar es Salaam to Tabora-Kigoma and the other from Tabora-Mwanza. The line was originally built during British colonial administration to transport minerals. It is now taken out for both, primarily for freight carried as opposed to passengers. Tanzania Zambia Railways (TAZARA) connects Ilala Dar es Salaam with Zambia.

Mwalimu Nyerere International Airport is home in the Ilala Municipal Council as the major entrance for incoming and exiting aviation passengers in the country. Tanzania Airport Authority manages the airport.

Agriculture
Farming and livestock are another key economic activity in Ilala Municipality, employing 13% of the population. Cattle, goats, sheep, donkeys, pigs, and chickens are among the livestock kept in the municipality. Fishing in the Indian Ocean also employs a significant number of people in the municipality.
Cassava, sweet potatoes, paddy, maize, and cowpeas are among the principal food crops farmed. Cassava is the principal food crop in rural areas, where it is cooked fresh or dried for flour production. Sweet potatoes and paddy are two more food crops grown throughout the lengthy rainy season, particularly in waterlogged areas.

The main cash crops farmed in Ilala Municipal Council include a range of vegetables such as amaranthus, Chinese cabbages, egg plants, okra, kale, and leek (matembele), as well as fruits such as citrus, passionate, pawpaws (papaya), pineapples, mangoes, cucumbers, and cashew nuts. Because of the city's vast population, a market for crop produce exists, and crops can be sold in various marketplaces in Kariakoo, Buguruni, Kisutu, and Chanika.

Ilala Municipal Council is home to a variety of established enterprises. Medium-sized industries that process food, beverages, and textiles are among the most important. Others include small-scale industries that dominate a variety of food and textile products. Small-scale industries include hulling and milling machines, as well as fruit processing machines, which add value to agricultural basic products.

GDP
Dar es Salaam Region offers economic potentials in industrial production and business transactions, with Ilala Municipality being the most important.
According to the 2007 Dar es Salaam Regional Profile, the Region contributed around 17% of the country's Gross Domestic Product (GDP) yearly. According to the 2018 Dar es Salaam Regional Profile, the region's income climbed from TZS. 17.5 trillion in 2016 to TZS. 20.1 trillion in 2017, representing a Tsh 2.5 trillion or 12.68% rise. The average yearly per capita income in the Dar es Salaam region increased by 13.4% in 2017 to Sh 4,004,088.70 from Sh 3,227,593.23 in 2016.

Tourism
The National Museum is the main attraction in the Ilala district. The British constructed it as the King George V Memorial Museum in 1940. In 1963, new structures that are now part of the museum were built by Nyerere's government. The museum houses Tanzanian historical documents, marine biology, and ethnography. The museum also houses the skull of Australopithecus Boisei, which was discovered in 1959 in Olduvai Gorge by the late Dr. Leakey. There is also the Makumbusho Village, which is part of the national museum and deals with many traditional Tanzanian ethnic heritage such as culture, dances, housing, as well as other tangible qualities. The District has one forest reserve, the Zingiziwa Mangrove Forest Reserve (100.5 ha)

Demographics
Like most of Dar es Salaam, Ilala is the ancestral home of the Zaramo people and some Ndengereko communities. However, as a result of urbanization, many people from many ethnic backgrounds have emigrated into the municipality, making it tribally diverse. There is no single ethnic group that constitutes more than a quarter of the overall population.

The district has become a cosmopolitian community of people from all over the world. The municipality had a total population of 1,220,611, with 595,928 men and 624,683 females, for a sex ratio of 95. Vingunguti ward had the largest population of 106,946 people, while Kivukoni ward had the smallest number of 6,742 people. Females continue to outnumber males in almost all wards, with the exception of a few wards such as Mchikichini, Kariakoo, Jangwani, Gerezani, Mchafukoge, Kivukoni, and Upanga Magharibi. The municipality had 300,674 households, with an average household size of 4.1 people. Vingunguti Ward continues to have the biggest population of 130,264 people, followed by Kiwalani Ward with 101,104 people, and Kivukoni Ward with 8,716 people.

Population growth rates in Ilala Municipal Council grew from 4.6% in 2002 to 5.6% in 2012. It could be linked to enhanced municipal health services and a higher level of living. Between 2002 and 2012, the Municipality's population density went from an average of 3,022 people per square kilometer to 5,810 persons per square kilometer. Migration into the municipality is another element contributing to the quicker rate of growth. Between 2002 and 2012, the population of Ilala Municipality increased by 92.2%, from 634,924 to 1,220,611. This increase has an impact on the provision of social services to all Ilala Municipality stakeholders. The rise was substantially greater in the Ukonga division, which increased by 475,778 individuals during the two inter-census periods.

According to the 2012 Population and Housing Census, Ilala Municipality had 300,674 households divided into 26 wards, with Vingunguti ward having the most households (28,994 households).
Table 3 shows that Kivukoni ward has the fewest households (1,343 households). This is owing in part to the fact that the majority of the buildings in this region are Government Offices, with very few residential buildings. According to the 2012 Population and Housing Census, the sex ratio for Ilala Municipality was 95, suggesting that the municipality had more females than males. Kariakoo ward had the highest sex ratio (113), while Kimanga ward had the lowest (90).

Administration 
Ilala Municipal Council was one of the first 38 Local Government Authorities to undergo restructuring as part of phase one of the Local Government Reform Programme (LGRP) in order to meet the qualities required by the Local Government Act No. 6 of 1999, which aims to devolve political, legal, administrative, and financial powers to local authorities. Ilala Municipal Council was established in 1992, following a decade of poor performance by the old Dar es Salaam City Council, which caused the government to organize a probe team that produced the Mulokozi Report. Following this analysis, the government decided to reform Dar es Salaam's local government system in 1993.

In 1996, the government disbanded the City Council and established the Dar es Salaam City Commission as an interim administration with the broad mandates of the three restructuring programs.
One of the programs was the formation of three new municipal councils, namely Ilala, Temeke, and Kinondoni, with the goal of responding to local demands and conditions for the best service delivery. Thus, on February 1, 2001, the Ilala Municipal Council (together with the citywide authority and the other two municipalities) was formally constituted.

Ilala Municipal Council is organized into three administrative divisions: Ilala, Ukonga, and Kariakoo. The district is divided into wards, which are further subdivided into mitaa. The ward is made up of a set number of mitaa. There are 36 wards and 159 mitaa in the Municipal Council.

The wards are listed below:

 Buguruni
 Chanika
 Gerezani
 Gongolamboto
 Ilala
 Jangwani
 Kariakoo
 Kimanga
 Kinyerezi
 Kipawa
 Kitunda
 Kisutu
 Kivukoni
 Kivule
 Kiwalani
 Majohe
 Mchafukoge
 Mchikichini
 Msongola
 Pugu
 Segerea
 Tabata
 Ukonga
 Upanga East
 Upanga West
 Vingunguti

Health and Education

Health
Ilala District has 142 health care facilities. The total number of public Privately held dispensaries made for 77.5% of all dispensaries in Ilala Municipality. and only 22.5% were owned by the government. The district has six health centers and one large public hospital. Most common illnesses in the district are Upper respiratory infection, malaria, urinary tract infection, hypertension, and non-severe pneumonia were the most commonly reported causes of morbidity for outpatients in 2015 and 2018.

Education
The municipality contains 237 pre-primary schools, 121 of which are government-run and 116 of which are privately operated. In 2018, the Municipality has 235 primary schools, with 120 being government-run and 115 being privately owned. There are 98 secondary schools in the Municipal Council. There are 51 public schools and 47 private schools among these.In terms of secondary school enrollment, there were 67,652 students enrolled in 2018. Girls made up 52.4% of those enrolled in secondary schools, while boys made up the remaining 47.6%. The Municipal Council is home to nine Higher Learning Institutions, six of which are government-run and three of which are privately held.

References

Dar es Salaam
Districts of Dar es Salaam Region
 
Populated places in Dar es Salaam Region